The Chimney Sweepers Act 1834 was a British Act of Parliament passed to try to stop child labour. Many boys as young as six were being used as chimney sweeps.

This act stated that an apprentice must express himself in front of a magistrate that he was willing and desirous.  Masters must not take on boys under the age of fourteen.  An apprentice could not be lent to another master.  The master could only have six apprentices.  Boys under fourteen who were already apprenticed, must wear brass cap badges on a leather cap.  Apprentices were not allowed to climb flues to extinguish fires.  Street cries were regulated.

References
Notes

Bibliography

United Kingdom Acts of Parliament 1834
United Kingdom labour law
Child labour law
1834 in labor relations
Chimney sweeps